Daniel Marsh is an Australian cricketer.

Daniel Marsh may also refer to:
 Daniel Webster Marsh (1838–1916), Canadian politician
 Dan Marsh (born 1956), American former professional wrestler 
 Daniel L. Marsh (1880–1968), president of Boston University
 Daniel G. Marsh (born 1937), American politician in the state of Washington
 Daniel Marsh (Massachusetts politician), representative to the Great and General Court
 Daniel Marsh (curler), Canadian curler
 Daniel William Marsh (born 1997), American murderer and perpetrator of the murders of Claudia Maupin and Oliver Northup